District 4 can refer to:

District 4, Düsseldorf, in Germany
District 4, Grand Bassa County, in Liberia
District 4 (Ho Chi Minh City), in Vietnam
District 4 (New York City Council), in the United States
IV District, Turku, in Finland
Aussersihl, also known as District 4, in Zürich, Switzerland
District 4, an electoral district of Malta
District 4, a police district of Malta
District 4 (Hunger Games), fictional district in the Hunger Games books and films

See also
Sector 4 (Bucharest)
District 3 (disambiguation)
District 5 (disambiguation)